Czech nationalism is a form of nationalism which asserts that Czechs are a nation and promotes the cultural unity of Czechs. Modern Czech nationalism arose in the 19th century in the form of the Czech National Revival. In 1848, Czech nationalism became an important political factor in the Austrian Empire due to the activities of the Old Czech Party, led by František Palacký. During World War I, Czech nationalist politicians, such as Karel Kramář in the Czech lands and Tomáš Garrigue Masaryk abroad, endorsed the idea of independence from Austro-Hungarian rule.

After 1918 and the creation of Czechoslovakia, the absolute majority of Czech politicians and society adopted Czechoslovakism, that is, the notion of a unified state including Slovakia.

The transformation of Czechoslovakia into a liberal market economy during the years 1990-1992 saw disputes between Czechs and Slovaks about the character of the Czechoslovak federation. Separatist forces were strengthened by Slovak nationalist aspirations as well as by Czech economic nationalism, the latter based on the perception that the Czech lands were subsidizing less-developed Slovakia. Czechoslovakia was divided into the Czech Republic and Slovakia, with the Czech Republic becoming independent on 1 January 1993.

List of Czech nationalist political parties

Current nationalist parties or parties with nationalist factions

Right-wing
Freedom and Direct Democracy
Unified – Alternative for Patriots
Tricolour Citizens' Movement
Civic Democratic Party
Civic Conservative Party
Svobodní
Party of Common Sense
National Democracy
Workers' Party of Social Justice

Left-wing
Czech National Social Party
National Socialists – Left of the 21st century
Party of Civic Rights
Czech National Socialist Party
Czech Sovereignty

See also
Czechs
Czech Republic
Czech National Revival
Czechoslovakism

Notes

 
Society of the Czech Republic